Internal Exile may refer to:
 A form of exile in which one is banished to remote part of one's own country rather than being deported
Internal exile in Greece, practiced until 1974
 Internal Exile (Los Illegals), 1983 album
 Internal Exile (Fish album), 1991 album